Browning is an unincorporated community in Wilcox County, in the U.S. state of Georgia.

History
Variant names were "Bede" and "Browning Station". Beside the post office, the community had a railroad depot.

References

Unincorporated communities in Wilcox County, Georgia